A Dangerous Game is a 1922 American silent drama film directed by King Baggot and starring Gladys Walton, Spottiswoode Aitken and Otto Hoffman.

Cast
 Gladys Walton as Gretchen Ann Peebles
 Spottiswoode Aitken as Edward Peebles
 Otto Hoffman as Uncle Stillson Peebles
 Rosa Gore as Aunt Constance
 William Robert Daly as Bill Kelley
 Kate Price as Mrs. Kelley
 Robert Agnew as John Kelley
 Edward Jobson as Pete Sebastian
 Anne Schaefer as Stella Sebastian
 Christine Mayo as Madame Gaunt
 Harry Carter as Her Manager
 Bill Gibbs as Butler

References

Bibliography
 Munden, Kenneth White. The American Film Institute Catalog of Motion Pictures Produced in the United States, Part 1. University of California Press, 1997.

External links
 

1922 films
1922 drama films
1920s English-language films
American silent feature films
Silent American drama films
American black-and-white films
Films directed by King Baggot
Universal Pictures films
1920s American films